Cleistosphaeridium is a genus of dinoflagellates in the order Gonyaulacales.

Species list 
 Cleistosphaeridium aciculare
 Cleistosphaeridium actinocoronatum
 Cleistosphaeridium ambiguum
 Cleistosphaeridium ancoriferum
 Cleistosphaeridium ancyreum
 Cleistosphaeridium araneosum
 Cleistosphaeridium armatum
 Cleistosphaeridium ashdodense
 Cleistosphaeridium australe
 Cleistosphaeridium baculatum
 Cleistosphaeridium bahiaense
 Cleistosphaeridium bergmannii
 Cleistosphaeridium bifide
 Cleistosphaeridium bifurcatum
 Cleistosphaeridium brevibaculum
 Cleistosphaeridium brevispinosum
 Cleistosphaeridium bulbum
 Cleistosphaeridium centrocarpum
 Cleistosphaeridium cephalum
 Cleistosphaeridium clavulum
 Cleistosphaeridium commixtum
 Cleistosphaeridium danicum
 Cleistosphaeridium deflandrei
 Cleistosphaeridium digitale
 Cleistosphaeridium disjunctum
 Cleistosphaeridium diversispinosum
 Cleistosphaeridium echinoides
 Cleistosphaeridium ehrenbergii
 Cleistosphaeridium elegans He Chengquan 1991
 Cleistosphaeridium elegans He Chengquan, Zhu Shenzhao and Jin Guangxing in He Chengquan et al. 1989
 Cleistosphaeridium eocenicum
 Cleistosphaeridium erectum
 Cleistosphaeridium flexuosum
 Cleistosphaeridium fungosum
 Cleistosphaeridium furcillatum
 Cleistosphaeridium garampaniense
 Cleistosphaeridium giganteum
 Cleistosphaeridium granulatum
 Cleistosphaeridium hallembayense
 Cleistosphaeridium heteracanthum
 Cleistosphaeridium huguoniotii
 Cleistosphaeridium iaculigerum
 Cleistosphaeridium insolitum
 Cleistosphaeridium israelianum
 Cleistosphaeridium lacustre
 Cleistosphaeridium laxabaculum
 Cleistosphaeridium leve
 Cleistosphaeridium lumectum
 Cleistosphaeridium machaerophorum
 Cleistosphaeridium mediterraneum
 Cleistosphaeridium microcystum
 Cleistosphaeridium mikirii
 Cleistosphaeridium minus
 Cleistosphaeridium mojsisovicsii
 Cleistosphaeridium multifurcatum
 Cleistosphaeridium multifurcillatum
 Cleistosphaeridium multispinosum
 Cleistosphaeridium nanus
 Cleistosphaeridium nenjiangense
 Cleistosphaeridium oligacanthum
 Cleistosphaeridium panniforme
 Cleistosphaeridium panshanense
 Cleistosphaeridium parvum
 Cleistosphaeridium patagonicum
 Cleistosphaeridium paucifurcatum
 Cleistosphaeridium pectiniforme
 Cleistosphaeridium perforoconum
 Cleistosphaeridium pilosum
 Cleistosphaeridium placacanthum
 Cleistosphaeridium polyacanthum
 Cleistosphaeridium polyozum
 Cleistosphaeridium polypes
 Cleistosphaeridium polypetellum
 Cleistosphaeridium polytrichum
 Cleistosphaeridium radiculopse
 Cleistosphaeridium regulatum
 Cleistosphaeridium reticuloideum
 Cleistosphaeridium sarmentum
 Cleistosphaeridium selseyense
 Cleistosphaeridium separatum
 Cleistosphaeridium shandongense
 Cleistosphaeridium sijuense
 Cleistosphaeridium solidum
 Cleistosphaeridium sphericum
 Cleistosphaeridium spinosum
 Cleistosphaeridium spinulastrum
 Cleistosphaeridium spiralisetum
 Cleistosphaeridium spissum
 Cleistosphaeridium tenue
 Cleistosphaeridium tenuifilum
 Cleistosphaeridium tianshanense
 Cleistosphaeridium tiara
 Cleistosphaeridium tribuliferum
 Cleistosphaeridium uncinispinosum
 Cleistosphaeridium varispinosum
 Cleistosphaeridium williamsii
 Cleistosphaeridium xinjiangense

References

External links 
 Cleistosphaeridium at dinoflaj

Gonyaulacales
Dinoflagellate genera